Afrinvest (West Africa) Limited is a Nigerian capital market holding company with specialized subsidiaries focusing on the unique but integrated wealth management needs of clients in West Africa. The subsidiaries are Afrinvest Asset Management, Afrinvest Capital, Afrinvest Consulting, Afrinvest Securities and Afrinvest Trustees.

Afrinvest is both a provider of research content on the Nigerian market and an adviser to blue-chip companies across West Africa on M&A and international capital market transactions.

Regulated by the Securities and Exchange Commission (“SEC”) as an Issuing House and Underwriter, Afrinvest provides financial advisory services as well as capital raising to high net-worth individuals ("HNIs"), corporations, and governments.

The company is also licensed by the Nigerian SEC, through its subsidiary, Afrinvest Securities Limited (“ASL”), as a broker-dealer and authorized by the Nigerian Stock Exchange as a dealing member. ASL acts as a distribution channel for a variety of investment products and houses the company's research franchise.

Afrinvest Asset Management Limited (“AAML”) is licensed by the Nigerian SEC as a portfolio manager.

Afrinvest maintains established offices in Lagos, Abuja, Onitsha and Port-Harcourt.

History
Afrinvest was founded in 1995 by Godwin Obaseki as Securities Transactions & Trust Company (Nigeria) Limited (“SecTrust”). Over the years, SecTrust established a close relationship with its London-based partners (“Afrinvest Limited”), an investment banking firm regulated by the United Kingdom Financial Services Authority (“FSA”). Following commencement of its business restructuring in 2005, SecTrust combined with the Nigeria-based corporate finance business of Afrinvest (UK) Limited.

This phase of business restructuring was concluded in December 2005 and culminated in the renaming of SecTrust as Afrinvest (West Africa) Limited. Afrinvest has emerged as a full-service investment banking firm, engaged in investment banking, investment research, securities trading and asset management. The company has participated actively in a number of corporate finance transactions in Nigeria to date.

In 2012, the company restructured its businesses by establishing two wholly owned subsidiaries namely; 
 Afrinvest Securities Limited (ASL)
 Afrinvest Asset Management Limited (AAML)

The company is registered as an Issuing House by the SEC while its other two subsidiaries, Afrinvest Securities Limited and Afrinvest Asset Management Limited, house the company's broker-dealer and fund manager licenses respectively.
 The first-ever listing of a dollar-denominated fixed income fund in Nigeria—The Nigeria International Debt Fund 
 The first-ever issue of global depository receipts by a Sub-Saharan Africa corporate – United Bank for Africa Plc (UBA) 
 The first Eurobond issue by a Sub-Saharan Africa corporate outside South Africa – Guaranty Trust Bank Plc 
 The first listing of an African bank's global depositary receipts on the London Stock Exchange – Guaranty Trust Bank Plc 
 Financial adviser and broker on the largest listing on the Nigerian Stock Exchange (2.095 trillion) – Dangote Cement Plc 
 The first Nigerian asset manager to be rated A+

Subsidiaries

Afrinvest Asset Management Limited
Afrinvest Asset Management Limited (AAML) is licensed by the Nigerian SEC as a portfolio manager. AAML has a range of retail, mass affluent and HNI clients. In 2020, AAML floated a $2 million Afrinvest Dollar Fund, an open-ended mutual fund approved by the SEC.

Afrinvest Capital Limited

Afrinvest Consulting Limited

Afrinvest Securities Limited 
Afrinvest Securities Limited (“ASL”) is the licensed broker dealer and subsidiary of Afrinvest (West Africa) Limited (“AWA”). ASL acts as a distribution channel for a variety of investment products and houses the company's research franchise.

Afrinvest Trustees Limited 
Afrinvest Trustees Limited (“ATL”) is a company incorporated in Nigeria to provide trusteeship services in Nigeria.

Andromeda Technology Solutions Limited 
Andromeda Technology Solutions Limited (Andromeda) is the fintech arm of the group.

Corporate governance

Board of directors
 Donald Lawson – Chairman
 Ike Chioke – Group Managing Director
 Victor Ndukauba – Deputy Managing Director
 Onoise Onaghinon – Chief Operating Officer
 Olutoyin Odulate – Non-executive Director
 Ikechukwu Okeke – Non-executive Director
 Yvonne Isichei – Non-executive Director

As of May 31, 2017 Donald Lawson was a non-executive director at Afrinvest prior becoming chairman of the board. In 2021, Onoise Onaghinon was appointed chief operating officer. She joined Afrinvest in 2003 as an analyst for the investment banking division.

References
5. ↑ "Afrinvest launches Plutus Fund". Retrieved November 22, 2017.

Nigerian brands
Companies based in Lagos
Privately held companies of Nigeria
Investment companies of Nigeria
Financial services companies established in 1994
Nigerian companies established in 1994